Gushan District is district of Kaohsiung City, Taiwan.

Administrative divisions
The district consists of Gufeng, Xiongfeng, Qianfeng, Guangrong, Minzu, Neiwei, Jianguo, Zhongzheng, Zijiang, Longjing, Zhengde, Pinghe, Minjiang, Housheng, Longzi, Longshui, Mingcheng, Huafeng, Yuxing, Yufeng, Guyan, Shude, Baoshu, Xingzong, Guanghua, Shanxia, Hebian, Luchuan, Dengshan, Fengnan, Lixing, Xinmin, Yanping, Weisheng, Huian, Shoushan, Shaochuantou and Taoyuan Village.

Politics
The representative for Gushan on the city council is Lee Chiao-Ju.

Education

Universities
 National Sun Yat-sen University

Schools
 Dominican International School Kaohsiung

Tourist attractions
 Gushan Daitian Temple
 Former British Consulate at Takao
Hamasing
Takao Railway Museum
 Former Sanhe Bank
Former Yamagataya Bookstore
Hamasen Trader Building 
Takao Renaissance Association 
Sinbin Old Street 
Kaohsiung Wude Hall
Red Cross Center for Children (Former Japanese Patriotic Women's Association)
 Kaohsiung Port Warehouse No. 2 (former Kaohsiung Fisherman's Wharf)
 Kaohsiung Harbor Museum
Hamasen Museum of Taiwan Railway
Pier-2 Art Center
North Gate of Xiong Town
The Takao foreign cemetery 
Kaohsiung Martyrs' Shrine
Longquan Temple
Mount Shou
Shou Shan Zoo
Sizihwan
Sizihwan Tunnel
Li Family Historical Residence
 Kaohsiung Museum of Fine Arts

Transportation

Railway
 Neiwei railway station

Rapid transit
Gushan is serviced by the Sizihwan Station of the Orange Line and the Aozihdi Station of Red Line of the KMRT.

Water
The Cijin Ferry is operated between Gushan District and Cijin District by the government owned Kaohsiung Haboursteam Company (高雄輪船公司) between 6:00 AM and midnight with a one-way ticket price of NT$10.

Notable natives
 Chu Hsing-yu, member of Legislative Yuan (1993–2005)
 Huang Fei, singer

References

External links